Brick House (or Brick House Cigars) is a brand of cigars handmade in Nicaragua by the J.C. Newman Cigar Company.

History

The Brick House brand was created in 1937 by Julius Caesar Newman, founder of the J.C. Newman Cigar Company. He named the cigars to honor his family home in the Hungarian countryside, a brick house that housed the Newman family residence on the top floor and a local tavern they ran on the bottom floor. The earliest Brick House cigars were made using Cuban tobacco. The popularity of the brand declined, but in 2009 it was revived by third-generation owners Eric and Bobby Newman with the use of Nicaraguan tobaccos.

Awards
The cigar has received several awards, including the Best Bargain Cigar of 2009 by Cigar Aficionado.

Sizes

Construction
Wrapper: Nicaraguan Havana Subido
Binder: Nicaraguan
Filler: Nicaraguan

References

External links
 Official Website

Products introduced in 1937
Cigar brands